This is a list of events in Scottish television from 1971.

Events
8 February – The Colour Strike ends after three months.
1 September – Border Television celebrates ten years on air.. It marks the anniversary by beginning colour transmissions, albeit initially only from the Caldbeck.
30 September – Grampian Television celebrates ten years on air and to mark the anniversary, it begins broadcasting in colour.
Unknown – BBC Scotland presents Sunset Song, a television adaptation of Lewis Grassic Gibbon's novel

Debuts

ITV
29 July - Top Club on Grampian (1971–1998)

18 September - Beagan Gaidhlig

Television series
Scotsport (1957–2008)
Reporting Scotland (1968–1983; 1984–present)

Ending this year
3 January - Dr. Finlay's Casebook (1962–1971)

Births
23 March - Gail Porter, television presenter
18 April - David Tennant, actor
Unknown - Kate Dickie, actress
Unknown - Martin Geissler, actor
Unknown - Sanjeev Kohli, writer, comedian and actor

See also
1971 in Scotland

References

 
Television in Scotland by year
1970s in Scottish television